Tahqiqaat is a 1993 Indian Hindi-language thriller film, produced by K.C. Bokadia under the BMB Productions banner and directed by A. Jagannathan. It stars Jeetendra, Aditya Pancholi, Sangeeta Bijlani, Ronit Roy and Farheen, with music composed by Anu Malik. The film is a remake of the Malayalam film Post Mortem (1982). It was the only Hindi film directed by Jagannathan.

Plot 
The film begins in a town where Father Prem Fernandes, a Catholic Priest is adored by everyone. Peter is a justice-seeking ruffian who defies violations against the poor and Father always tries to mitigate him. Once, Peter disputes with Bhanu Pratap a millionaire and head of the town. Peter's sister Mary loves Ramesh son of Bhanu Pratap. Since Peter is anti-rich Mary takes Father’s help. Meanwhile, Ramesh leaves abroad when Mary becomes pregnant and confesses to Father. Then, he promises to find a solution. Overhearing it, Roopa the beau of Peter misinterprets their relationship and informs Peter. So, he revolts on Father, and gets arrested but succeeds in absconding. The next day, the public is aghast to see Mary’s dead body hanging from a tree. Assuming it is a suicide they bury the corpse without a postmortem. However, Father suspects something fishy, so, he approaches his twin S.P. Arun Kumar a sheer cop to perform the postmortem and he exhumes Mary's coffin. Here as thunderstruck, he finds Father Prem Fernandes' dead body in it. Thereupon, Peter is suspected, and S.P. Arun Kumar begins his investigation. In that process, S.P. and Peter encounter and move pawns. During that time, Peter learns the actuality through Mary’s friend Mumtaz and repents. Parallelly, S.P. horrifies everybody in the guise of Father’s ghost to uncover the real victim. In their trials, S.P. and Peter spot seized Ramesh who reveals Mary’s death as cold-blooded murder. Suddenly, a man in veil shoots which misfires and Ramesh dies. Shockingly, he turns to Bhanu Pratap who killed Mary as he detests knitting her with his son. Afterward, for fear of postmortem he seeks to dispose of the body which is witnessed by Father, therefore, he slaughtered him too. Finally, the movie ends with S.P. and Peter ceasing Bhanu Pratap.

Cast 
Jeetendra as Father Prem Fernandes / Police Superintendent Arun Kumar (Double Role)
Aditya Pancholi as Peter
Sangeeta Bijlani as Roopa
Ronit Roy as Ramesh
Farheen as Mary
Danny Denzongpa as Bhanupratap
Satyen Kappu as Anthony 
Sameer Khakhar as Salim
Mehmood as Micheal
Laxmikant Berde as Hawaldar Sakharam Dandekar
Mahesh Anand as Vikram
Bob Christo as Goon
Sulabha Arya as Mrs. Anthony
Guddi Maruti as Gulabo
Asha Sharma as Roopa's Mother

Soundtrack 
The music was composed by Anu Malik.

References

External links 

1993 action films
1993 films
1990s Hindi-language films
Films scored by Anu Malik
Indian action films
Hindi remakes of Malayalam films
Films directed by A. Jagannathan
Hindi-language action films